Italy competed at the 1991 Summer Universiade in Sheffield, United Kingdom and won 21 medals.

Medals

Details

References

External links
 Universiade (World University Games)
 WORLD STUDENT GAMES (UNIVERSIADE - MEN)
 WORLD STUDENT GAMES (UNIVERSIADE - WOMEN)

1991
1991 in Italian sport
Italy